Gerald Zaltman is the Joseph C. Wilson Professor Emeritus at Harvard Business School and the author and editor of 20 books, most recently How Customers Think (2003) and Marketing Metaphoria (2008).  In 1997 he founded the market research consulting firm Olson Zaltman Associates in partnership with Jerry C. Olson, Professor of Marketing Emeritus, Smeal College of Business at Penn State.  Zaltman patented, the Zaltman Metaphor Elicitation Technique, a method used to delve into the unconscious thinking that drives behavior.

Zaltman's academic specialization is in innovation, social change, and the representation of thought, which is expressed in a variety of publications throughout his career.

Education
Zaltman received his AB degree in Government from Bates College in 1960.  Two years later, he was awarded an MBA from the University of Chicago.  He was awarded a Doctoral degree in Sociology from Johns Hopkins University in 1968.

Work
After serving on the faculty of Northwestern University’s Kellogg School of Management (1968–1975) and on the faculty at the University of Pittsburgh (1975–1991), Zaltman was named the Joseph C. Wilson professor of Business Administration at Harvard Business School in 1991.

While at Harvard, Zaltman was awarded  for the Zaltman Metaphor Elicitation Technique (ZMET) in 1995, served as Director of the Seeing the Voice of the Customer Laboratory at Harvard Business School, and was co-director of the HBS Mind of the Market Laboratory.

In 1997, he and Jerry Olson from Penn State University's Smeal College of Business co-founded Olson Zaltman Associates, a market research and consulting firm that has worked with many Fortune 500 corporations including Procter & Gamble, Coca-Cola, Frito-Lay, Audi, Kraft, and Cisco.

Awards
In 2008, Zaltman was honored with Massachusetts Institute of Technology’s Buck Weaver Award sponsored by General Motors for outstanding work in bringing knowledge and practice together.

His previous awards include the American Marketing Association's Richard D. Irwin Distinguished Marketing Educator Award in 1989; the Association for Consumer Research Distinguished Fellow Award in 1990; the Knowledge Utilization Society's Thomas J. Kiresuk Award for Excellence in Scientific Research in 1992; the 2000 JAI Press Distinguished Scholar Award from the Society for Marketing Advances; and The Advertising Research Foundation Member Recognition Award in 2007.

Deep metaphors
Deep metaphors are unconscious "basic orienting structures of human thought" that affect how people process and react to information or a stimulus. They manifest themselves in surface metaphors used in everyday language and conversation; when grouped they constitute clues to what deep metaphor a person is using to frame or understand a topic (see Framing).  Deep metaphors can be used in a marketing context to help marketers communicate more effectively to consumers about a brand, product, or topic with the same viewing lens, or deep metaphor, their consumers are already using.

Cognitive linguists have written about the relationship between metaphor and its impact on the mind, specifically George Lakoff and Mark Johnson in Metaphors We Live By and Zoltan Kovecses in Metaphor: A Practical Introduction.. In Zaltman's book, Marketing Metaphoria, he outlines what he calls the seven giants or the most basic and most recurring deep metaphors : journey, balance, container, connection, resource, control, and transformation.  There are others such as force and paradox which are less common.

Zaltman Metaphor Elicitation Technique
Zaltman Metaphor Elicitation Technique is the first patented market research tool in the United States.  ZMET is a technique designed to elicit metaphors using a series of steps and non-directive probing.

Origin and patent
ZMET was born during a trip Zaltman took to remote areas of Nepal in 1990.  He gave locals, who had never taken photos before, cameras to take pictures of important things and events in their lives.  For example, in some cases, the assignment was: What photos would you take if you wanted to show someone else what life was like here? Two weeks later he returned to the regions covered initially, gave copies to the photographers, and interviewed them about the meaning of their photos.  Zaltman realized just how powerful the use of images “owned” by those being interviewed were in gaining a deep understanding of their implicit or tacit assumptions and beliefs. Zaltman noticed, for example, that they often cut off the feet of people appearing in their images.  It was discovered that this was deliberate. The Nepalese did not want to embarrass their friends and neighbors by showing their bare feet, which was a sign of poverty, and for this reason deliberately chose to leave it out of the photographic record.

Development
Zaltman began to wonder how this kind of insight could be used to gather consumer insights.  In 1993, he formed the Seeing the Voice of the Customer Lab at Harvard Business School, and, in 1997, it was renamed the Mind of the Market Lab.

ZMET draws on a variety of disciplines including neurobiology, psychology, semiotics, linguistics, and art theory to elicit metaphors that can reveal how a person conceptualizes a given topic. Metaphors are a way of learning or understanding a new piece of information by comparing it to a known piece of information (see Conceptual metaphor).

Applications
ZMET focuses on explaining the "why" behind the "what" of consumer behavior, allowing it to be used in a variety of applications from product development to communications evaluation.  Increasingly, it is being used to address issues faced by non profit organizations and to address organizational matters.

Other patents

Neuroimaging as a marketing tool 
 was issued on August 8, 2000 to Gerald Zaltman and Stephen Kosslyn on "neuroimaging as a means for validating whether a stimulus such as advertisement, communication, or product evokes a certain mental response such as emotion, preference, or memory, or to predict the consequences of the stimulus on later behavior such as consumption or purchasing."

Metaphor elicitation technique 
 was issued on November 13, 2001 to protect the right for using: 
 a metaphor elicitation technique in conjunction with physiological function monitoring to elicit, organize, and analyze data pertaining to a research topic. This data provides further insight and understanding which can be used in creating an appropriate marketing campaign for a product, improving inter-office communications and determining the presence of pre-existing biases or beliefs.

Selected publications

Books
Zaltman, G. and L. Zaltman, Marketing Metaphoria: What Deep Metaphors Reveal about the Minds of Consumers (2008).
Zaltman, Gerald. How Customers Think: Essential Insights into the Mind of the Markets. Boston: Harvard Business School Press (2003).
Barabba, V., and G. Zaltman. Hearing the Voice of the Market: Competitive Advantage Through Creative Use of Market Information. Boston: Harvard Business School Press (1991).

Selected articles
 Zaltman, G. and D. MacCaba, “Metaphor in Advertising.”  The SAGE Handbook of Advertising (2007): 135-154.The SAGE Handbook of Advertising
 Zaltman, G. and L. Zaltman, “What Do ‘Really Good’ Managers and ‘Really Good’ Researchers’ Want of One Another?” The Handbook of Marketing Research: Uses, Misuses, and Future Advances (2006): 33-48.
 Braun-Latour, Kathryn A., and Gerald Zaltman. "Memory Change: An Intimate Measure of Persuasion." Journal of Advertising Research (March 2006): 57-72. Advertising best practice, evidence and insights | WARC
 Mast, Fred W., and Gerald Zaltman. "A Behavioral Window on the Mind of the Market: An Application of the Response Time Paradigm." Brain Research Bulletin 67, no. 5 (November 2005): 422-427.
 Coulter, Robin A., Gerald Zaltman, and Keith S. Coulter. "Interpreting Consumer Perceptions of Advertising: An Application of the Zaltman Metaphor Elicitation Technique." Journal of Advertising (winter 2001).
 Zaltman, Gerald. "Consumer Researchers: Take a Hike!" Journal of Consumer Research 26, no. 4 (March 2000): 423-428.
 Rangan, V. K., Das Narayandas, and Gerald Zaltman. "The Pedagogy of Executive Education in Business Markets." Journal of Business-to-Business Marketing (fall 1998).
 Zaltman, Gerald. "Rethinking Market Research: Putting People Back In." Journal of Marketing Research 34, no. 4 (November 1997).
 Zaltman, Gerald. "Metaphorically Speaking." Marketing Research 8, no. 2 (summer 1996).
 Venkatesh, R., A. J. Kohli, and Gerald Zaltman. "Influence Strategies in Buying Centers." Journal of Marketing 59, no. 4 (October 1995): 71-82.
 Zaltman, Gerald, and R. Coulter. "Seeing the Voice of the Customer: Metaphor-based Advertising Research." Journal of Advertising Research 35, no. 4 (July–August 1995): 35-51.
 Moorman, C., R. Deshpande, and G. Zaltman. "Factors Affecting Trust in Market Research Relationships." Journal of Marketing 57, no. 1 (January, 1993): 81-101.
 Moorman, C., G. Zaltman, and Rohit Deshpandé. "Relationships between Providers and Users of Market Research: The Dynamics of Trust within and between Organizations." Journal of Marketing Research 29, no. 3 (August 1992): 314-28.

See also
 Conceptual blending
 Co-creation
 Conceptual metaphor
 Social marketing

Notes

External links
 Gerald Zaltman Harvard Business School
 Olson Zaltman Associates homepage

Articles on metaphor elicitation technique
Edwards, Jim. “Spotlight Flashback: Why Buy? Researchers seek An Answer” Brandweek (September 10, 2007).
Szegedy-Maszak, Marianne.  “Mysteries of the Mind” U.S. News & World Report (February 28, 2005): 53-61.
Wieners, Brad.  “Getting Inside- Way Inside- Your Customer’s Head” Business 2.0 (April 2003): 54-55.
Christensen, Glenn L. and Jerry Olson. “Mapping Consumers’ Mental Models with ZMET” Psychology and Marketing 19, 6 (June 2002): 477-502.

Harvard Business School faculty
University of Chicago Booth School of Business alumni
Johns Hopkins University alumni
Bates College alumni
University of Pittsburgh faculty
Year of birth missing (living people)
Living people
Marketing people
American marketing people
Metaphor theorists
Market researchers
Fellows of the American Marketing Association